Kauko Kalevi Huuskonen (21 April 1932, in Vesanto – 7 January 1999) was a Finnish biathlete. In 1961, he won the Biathlon World Championships at the individual 20 kilometre distance. In that same year he was named Finnish Sports Personality of the Year.

References 

 

1932 births
1999 deaths
People from Vesanto
Finnish male biathletes
Biathlon World Championships medalists
Sportspeople from North Savo